The Fighting O'Flynn is a 1949 American adventure film directed by Arthur Pierson. The film's screenplay by Douglas Fairbanks Jr. is based on the novel of the same name by Justin Huntly McCarthy. Fairbanks stars, along with Helena Carter.

Plot

Nearing the end of the 18th century, Napoleon's vast army is sailing towards the Irish coast. The national poet and freedom fighter who goes by the name of "The O'Flynn" is traveling back to the castle where he was born, when he encounters a coach being robbed by rogues. The leader of the outlaws is a man named Hendrigg. The robbery fails thanks to O'Flynn's efforts. He invites the passenger, Lady Benedetta, to take refuge in his castle.

Lady Benedetta eventually agrees to take up the invitation from the elegant O'Flynn, who rode ahead to prepare the castle. When O'Flynn arrives at the castle, Dooley is waiting to arrest him for unpaid debts. O'Flynn gets off by telling the man of a treasure buried inside the castle.

O'Flynn is unaware that Lady Benedetta is really the daughter of the Viceroy of Ireland. She is in turn unaware that agents have been sent out by Napoleon to spy on her, disguised as travelers. They have been informed that Lady Benedetta has Napoleon's plans to invade Britain and is to deliver them to her father. Both Lady Benedetta and the agents arrive to the castle in the night.

Dooley fends off the agents and saves both Lady Benedetta and the unsuspecting O'Flynn. Napoleon's men attack them on their way to Dublin, but again they escape. They manage to give the plans to Lady Benedetta's father. Because of his leadership qualities, O'Flynn is made a captain in the Irish Army.

O'Flynn is attracted to Lady Benedetta, and when he finds out that her fiancé, Lord Sedgemouth, is in favor of Napoleon, he challenges his rival to a duel. Being a swordsman, he wins the duel quite easily, and decides to win Lady Benedetta's heart. The lord counters by letting Lady Benedetta believe that O'Flynn is involved with a courtesan named Fancy Free, which leads the lady to denounce him.

In battle, O'Flynn disguises himself as a deserter to get behind enemy lines. He is brought in front of Napoleon's general, Van Dronk, and they spend the night drinking together. When the general passes out, O'Flynn puts on his uniform and tries to steal the new plans for invading Britain. Unfortunately, one of the general's lieutenants recognizes him as an impostor and he is swiftly court-marshaled and sentenced to death. Luck is on his side when the firing squad misses, and he escapes unharmed. He hides in Lord Sedgemouth's tent, where the courtesan Fancy Free is also present. O'Flynn persuades Fancy to help him get the invading plans, but before they can, Lord Sedgemouth walks in on them and tries to shoot O'Flynn, who again manages to escape.

Lady Benedetta learns that Fancy is with lord Sedgemouth and goes to see O'Flynn. They kiss and O'Flynn goes on to claim that Lord Sedgemouth is a traitor who must be treated as such. He manages to make the French ships near the coast to turn back by signaling to them from ashore. Then he takes on Lord Sedgemouth at his castle and manage to defeat him with the help of the viceroy's men. After this, he kisses Lady Benedetta.

Cast
Douglas Fairbanks Jr. as The O'Flynn 
Helena Carter as Lady Benedetta
Richard Greene as Lord Philip Sedgemonth 
Patricia Medina as Fancy Free 
Arthur Shields as Dooley
J.M. Kerrigan as Timothy 
Ludwig Donath as Hendrigg
Lumsden Hare as the viceroy 
Otto Waldis as General van Dronk
Henry Brandon as Lt. Corpe
Harry Cording as Pat 
John Doucette as Jack
Patrick O'Moore as Major Steele

Source Material
The movie was based on a play The O'Flynn by Justin Huntly McCarthy which premiered in 1910 starring Sir Herbert Tree. It was set in Ireland during the reign of William of Orange and dealt with the attempt of James II to retake his throne.

Huntly then adapted his play into a novel, which was published in 1910.

Huntly's novel If I Were King was turned into a popular musical The Vagabond King. In the late 1920s The O'Flynn was adapted into an operetta and there were several announcements that it would play on Broadway over the next few years. It eventually opened in 1934.

Film Development
In 1946 Edward Small announced he had Robert Thoeren adapting a script from the book. The following year Douglas Fairbanks Jnr bought the rights to the novel and Thoren's script. Glynn Tyron was put to work on the script.

In December 1948 Universal announced the film would be part of its lineup for the following year. It was Fairbanks' third independent production.

Patricia Medina was borrowed from MGM. Her then husband Richard Greene was signed to play the villain.

The film was shot in five weeks.

Reception
Filmink called it "a fun movie" where Carter plays "another good girl who looks like she wants to be naughty, a Maid Marian type, and Carter teams well with Fairbanks."

Fairbanks and Carter were going to work together again on The Caballero but the film was not made.

References

External links
 

Review of film at Variety

1949 films
Films based on Irish novels
1940s adventure drama films
Films set in Ireland
Films set in the 1790s
Napoleonic Wars films
American adventure drama films
Films directed by Arthur Pierson
Films scored by Frank Skinner
1940s historical films
American historical films
Universal Pictures films
American black-and-white films
1949 drama films
1940s English-language films
1940s American films